All Can Work is an album by the John Hollenbeck Large Ensemble, released on January 26, 2018. The album's tracks were recorded on June 15–16, 2017.

Track listing
 "Iud"
 "All Can Work"
 "Elf"
 "Heyoke"
 "This Kiss"
 "From Trees"
 "Long Swing Dream"
 "The Model"

References

2018 albums